CEAR namely  Central Electricity Authority (Measures relating to Safety and Electric Supply) Regulations, 2010 are regulations framed by Central Electricity Authority of India  under  Indian Electricity Act, 2003, to regulate measures relating to safety and electric supply in India.

History
CEAR came into effect 20 September 2010, in place of The Indian Electricity Rules, 1956.

The Electricity Act, 2003, was formulated combining the Indian Electricity Act 1910 and Indian Electricity (supply) Act 1948.

Earthing provisions and safety
Under CEAR, rule 41, there is specific provision of  earthing neutral wire of a 3-phase, 4-wire system and the additional third wire of a 2- phase, 3-wire system. Earthing is to be done with two separate connections.  Grounding system also to have minimum two or more earth pits (electrode) such that proper grounding takes place. As per the rule 42, installation with  load above 5 kW exceeding 250 V shall have suitable Earth leakage protective device to isolate the load in case of earth fault or leakage.

Neutral and earth run separately on overhead line/cables. Separate conductor for overhead lines and armouring of cables are used for earth connection. Additional earth electrodes/pits are installed at user ends for proper earth.

All metal casing or metallic coverings of electric supply line or apparatus to be connected with earth and all such earthling points shall be so joined  to make good mechanical and electrical connection in complete system.

Earthing in mines
Earthing in an underground mine  shall be carried out by connection to an earthing system at the surface of the mine as per rule 99.

As per rule 100, protective equipment is to be placed in the mines for automatic disconnection of supply  when there is earth fault exceeding 750 milliampere in 250 V to 1000 Volt installations. For open cast mine the limit is 50 ampere in installations of voltage exceeding 1100 V and up to 11 kV. The earth leakage current is to be restricted by placing suitable neutral grounding resistance (NGR) in all the distribution transformers.

Salient features
Chapters and regulations there in:-
  Chapter - I	Definitions

1	Short title and Commencement

2	Definitions

  Chapter - II	

3	Designating person(s) to operate and carry out the work on electrical lines and apparatus

4	Inspection of designated officers and other safety measures

5	Electrical Safety Officer

6	Safety measures for operation and maintenance of electric plants

7	Safety measures for operation and maintenance of transmission, distribution systems

8	Keeping of records and inspection there of

9	Deposit of maps

10	Deposit of printed copies

11	Plan for area of supply to be made and kept open for inspection

 Chapter - III	General safety requirements

12	General safety requirements, pertaining to construction, installation, protection, operation and maintenance of electric supply lines 
apparatus

13	Service lines and apparatus on consumer’s premises

14	Switchgear on consumer’s premises

15	Identification of earthed and earthed neutral conductors and position of switches and switchgear therein

16	Earthed terminal on consumer’s premises

17	Accessibility of bare conductors

18	Danger Notices

19	Handling of electric supply lines and apparatus

20	Supply to vehicles and cranes

21	Cables for portable or transportable apparatus

22	Cables protected by bituminous materials

23	Street boxes

24	Distinction of different circuits

25	Distinction of the installations having more than one feed

26	Accidental charging

27	Provisions applicable to protective equipment

28	Display of instructions for resuscitation of persons suffering from electric shock

29	Precautions to be adopted by consumers, owners, occupiers, electrical contractors, electrical workmen and suppliers

30	Periodical inspection and-testing of Installations

31	Testing of consumer's installation

32	Installation and testing of generating units

Chapter - IV	General conditions relating to supply and use of electricity

33	Precautions against leakage before connection

34	Leakage on consumer's premises

35	Supply and use of electricity

36	Provisions for supply and use of electricity in multi-storied building more than 15 meters in height

37	Conditions applicable to installations of voltage exceeding 250 Volts

38	Appeal to Electrical Inspector in regard to defects

39	Precautions against failure of supply and notice of failures

 Chapter - V	Safety Provisions for Electrical Installations and apparatus of voltage not exceeding 650 volts

40	Test for resistance of insulation

41	Connection with earth

42	Earth leakage protective device

Chapter - VI	Safety Provisions for Electrical Installations and apparatus of voltage exceeding 650 volts

43	Approval by Electrical Inspector

44	Use of electricity at voltage exceeding 650 Volts

45	Inter-locks and protection for use of electricity at voltage exceeding 650 Volts

46	Testing, Operation and Maintenance

47	Precautions to be taken against excess leakage in case of metal sheathed electric supply lines

48	Connection with earth for apparatus exceeding 650 V

49	General conditions as to transformation and control of electricity

50	Pole type sub-stations

51	Condensers

52	Supply to luminous tube sign installations of voltage exceeding 650 Volts but not exceeding 33 kV

53	Supply to electrode boilers of voltage exceeding 650 Volt but not exceeding 33 kV

54	Supply to X-ray and high frequency installations

 Chapter - VII	Safety requirements for overhead lines, underground cables and generating stations

55	Material and strength

56	Joints

57	Maximum stresses and factors of safety

58	Clearance above ground of the lowest conductor of overhead lines

59	Clearance between conductors and trolley wires

60	Clearance from buildings of lines of voltage and service lines not exceeding 650 Volts

61	Clearances from buildings of lines of voltage exceeding 650 V

62	Conductors at different voltages on same supports

63	Erection or alteration of buildings, structures, flood banks and elevation of roads

64	Transporting and storing of material near overhead lines

65	General clearances

66	Routes proximity to aerodromes

67	Maximum interval between supports

68	Conditions to apply where telecommunication lines and power lines are carried on same supports

69	Lines crossing or approaching each other and lines crossing street and road

70	Guarding

71	Service lines from overhead lines

72	Earthing

73	Safety and protective devices

74	Protection against lightning

75	Unused overhead lines

76	Laying of cables

77	Protection against electromagnetic interference

 Chapter - VIII	Safety requirements for Electric Traction

78	Application of chapter

79	Voltage of supply to vehicle

80	Insulation of lines

81	Insulation of returns

82	Proximity to metallic pipes

83	Difference of potential on return

84	Leakage on conduit system

85	Leakage on system other than conduit system

86	Passengers not to have access to electric circuit

87	Isolation of sections

88	Minimum size and strength of trolley wire

89	Height of trolley wire and length of span

90	Earthing of guard wires

91	Proximity to magnetic observatories and laboratories

92	Records

 Chapter - IX	Safety requirements for mines and oil fields

93	Application of chapter

94	Responsibility for observance

95	Notices

See also
 IEC 60364
 National Electrical Safety Code  
 Canadian Electrical Code
 IEEE C2
 PSE law, Japan Electrical Safety Law.
 Slash rating

References

External links
 ; Central Electricity Authority
 ; Electricity Act, 2003 (36 of 2003); the Central Electricity Authority hereby makes the following regulations for Measures relating to Safety and Electric Supply

Electrical safety
Electrical wiring
Safety codes
Indian legislation